The men's long jump event  at the 1982 European Athletics Indoor Championships was held on 7 March.

Results

References

Long jump at the European Athletics Indoor Championships
Long